Charles Lee Sheldon is an American academic, game writer and designer, book author, television producer and scriptwriter, often in the mystery genre, and is best known for creating game teaching projects.

Education 
Sheldon has a bachelor of fine arts degree in stage directing from Boston University, and an MFA in film direction from California Institute of the Arts. During his time as a student at CalArts, he was mentored under Alexander Mackendrick. In addition, he had two pairs of mentors while he was a writer and producer in television — Ron Austin and Jim Buchanan, as well as William Link and Richard Levinson.

Career 
His television credits as a scriptwriter include Charlie's Angels, Quincy, M.E., Cagney & Lacey, The Edge of Night (Head Writer), Snoops, Another World, and Star Trek: The Next Generation. He was nominated for two Edgar Awards from the Mystery Writers of America and a Writers Guild of America award.

As the new head writer of The Edge of Night in 1983, he changed the soap opera to a faster pace, with shorter timelines for crime mystery plots and more storylines within the half-hour show. He promoted the use of computers for speeding the writing and development process.

Sheldon said he was brought on to Star Trek: The Next Generation as a producer in 1990 to add more mystery and action to the fourth season. He wrote the episode, Remember Me, which featured the character Beverly Crusher trying to solve the mystery of disappearing crew members that others don't remember. He recommended a former co-worker, Jeri Taylor, to join the series.

In 1995, Sheldon supplied the voice of Monk 13 in the video game Ripley's Believe It or Not!: The Riddle of Master Lu in which he also wrote the scripts for the gameplay and casting and directing the voice actors.

He is the author of a mystery novel, Impossible Bliss, and two non-fiction books, The Multiplayer Classroom: Designing Coursework as a Game, released in 2009 by CRC Press and Character Development and Storytelling for Games released in its second edition in 2013 by Course Technology.

Sheldon was lead writer on 2014's Harmonix game Disney Fantasia: Music Evolved, lead writer on Zynga's Facebook game, Adventure World, and lead writer on Star Trek: Infinite Space from Gameforge; as well as writer/designer of the Agatha Christie video game series published by The Adventure Company (And Then There Were None, Murder on the Orient Express and Evil Under the Sun).

In 2006, Sheldon became an assistant professor in the Department of Telecommunications at Indiana University until 2010. For a couple of his game design classes, he used the structure of role-playing games for teaching with experience points to decide grades. One of his projects, Londontown, is a virtual world that emphasizes storytelling.

He previously taught as an associate professor in the communication and media department and as co-director of the Games and Simulation Arts and Sciences program at the Rensselaer Polytechnic Institute in Troy, New York.

He is a professor of practice in game writing in the Interactive Media & Game Development Program at Worcester Polytechnic Institute in Worcester, Massachusetts, starting in 2014.

In February 2020, Sheldon wrote an episode of Extra Credits on developing NPCs with narrative depth. He now holds a recurring position on the company's writing staff.

References

External links
 Curriculum Vitae on Academia.edu
 
 
 Lee Sheldon Interview (2007), Adventure Classic Gaming
 Lee Sheldon Interview (2001), Quandary Games

Published articles
 Op-Ed: Writing off Game Writers

Living people
Year of birth missing (living people)
Boston University College of Fine Arts alumni
California Institute of the Arts alumni
American soap opera writers
American male television writers
American television producers
American video game designers
Video game writers
American male voice actors
American casting directors
American voice directors
Video game directors
American male writers